Zaebos: Book of Angels Volume 11 is an album of compositions by John Zorn released in 2008 by experimental jazz fusion trio Medeski Martin & Wood performing compositions from John Zorn's second Masada book, "The Book of Angels" on the Tzadik label.

Reception

The Allmusic review by stated "The music resembles other Masada work in its balance of grooves, frenetic soloing, and swirling melodies derived from klezmer, the Middle East, and Eastern European traditions. But keyboardist John Medeski, bassist Chris Wood, and drummer Billy Martin bring their unique, groove-saturated stamp to Zorn’s experimentation, resulting in an overall accessible performance that overflows with technical mastery". All About Jazz reviewer Troy Collins stated "Zaebos is a homecoming of sorts for both Zorn and the Brooklyn-based trio. An endlessly rewarding listen, this session is one of Medeski, Martin & Wood's most varied and enjoyable releases, and one of the most commanding interpretations of the Book of Angels".

Track listing
All compositions by John Zorn
"Zagzagel" - 5:24
"Sefrial" - 4:47
"Agmatia" - 5:21
"Rifion" - 4:26
"Chafriel" - 7:22
"Ahaij" - 3:42
"Asaliah" - 4:42
"Vianuel" - 3:33
"Jeduthun" - 3:05
"Malach Ha-Sopher" - 6:50
"Tutrusa`i" - 5:08

Personnel
John Medeski – keyboards
Chris Wood – electric bass, bass
Billy Martin – drums, percussion

References 

2008 albums
Medeski Martin & Wood albums
Book of Angels albums
Tzadik Records albums
Avant-garde jazz albums